Betoukoumba is a village in the Republic of the Congo. It sits on the border of the Central African Republic and is less than one kilometre from the geographical tripoint between the Republic of the Congo, the Central African Republic, and the Democratic Republic of the Congo.

Populated places in the Republic of the Congo
Likouala Department
Central African Republic–Republic of the Congo border crossings